The 1977 Giro d'Italia was the 60th running of the Giro, one of cycling's Grand Tours. It started in Bacoli, on 20 May, with a  prologue and concluded in Milan, on 13 June, with a  mass-start stage. A total of 130 riders from thirteen teams entered the 22-stage race, that was won by Belgian Michel Pollentier of the Flandria team. The second and third places were taken by Italians Francesco Moser and Gianbattista Baronchelli, respectively. Freddy Maertens won 7 of the first 11 stages before abandoning due to a crash on Stage 8B.

Maertens was one of five riders within 1:00 of the lead at the time of his abandonment. This followed his performance of winning 13 stages along with the General Classification at the Vuelta a month earlier.

Moser took the Pink jersey from Maertens in the first week and held it until the high mountains of stage 17 which ended in Cortina d'Ampezzo where Pollentier took a :03 lead by beating Moser by :25. Over the next few stages he built this lead up to about 2:00 before the final time trial where he won the stage by :30 over 2nd place Moser and sealed the Giro victory.

Amongst the other classifications that the race awarded, Sanson's Moser won the points classification, Faustino Fernández Ovies of KAS won the mountains classification, and Sanson's Mario Beccia completed the Giro as the best neo-professional in the general classification, finishing ninth overall. Flandria finished as the winners of the team points classification.

Teams

A total of 14 teams were invited to participate in the 1977 Giro d'Italia. Each team sent a squad of ten riders, so the Giro began with a peloton of 140 cyclists. Out of the 140 riders that started this edition of the Giro d'Italia, a total of 121 riders made it to the finish in Milan.

The teams entering the race were:

Pre-race favorites

The starting peloton did include the 1976 winner, Felice Gimondi. Freddy Maertens, Gianbattista Baronchelli, and Gimondi were seen by many news outlets to be the favorites to win the race.

Route and stages

The route for the race was revealed on 19 February 1977.

Classification leadership

There were four main individual classifications contested in the 1977 Giro d'Italia, as well as a team competition. Four of them awarded jerseys to their leaders. The general classification was the most important and was calculated by adding each rider's finishing times on each stage. The rider with the lowest cumulative time was the winner of the general classification and was considered the overall winner of the Giro. The rider leading the classification wore a pink jersey to signify the classification's leadership.

The second classification was the points classification. Riders received points for finishing in the top positions in a stage finish, with first place getting the most points, and lower placings getting successively fewer points. The rider leading this classification wore a purple (or cyclamen) jersey. The mountains classification was the third classification and its leader was denoted by the green jersey. In this ranking, points were won by reaching the summit of a climb ahead of other cyclists. Each climb was ranked as either first, second or third category, with more points available for higher category climbs.  Most stages of the race included one or more categorized climbs, in which points were awarded to the riders that reached the summit first. The Cima Coppi, the race's highest point of elevation, awarded more points than the other first category climbs. The Cima Coppi for this Giro was the Valparola Pass. The first rider to cross the Valparola Pass was Spanish rider Faustino Fernández Ovies. The fourth classification, the young rider classification, was decided the same way as the general classification, but exclusive to neo-professional cyclists (in their first three years of professional racing). The leader of the classification wore a white jersey.

The final classification, the team classification, awarded no jersey to its leaders. This was calculated by adding together points earned by each rider on the team during each stage through the intermediate sprints, the categorized climbs, stage finishes, etc. The team with the most points led the classification.

There were other minor classifications within the race, including the Campionato delle Regioni classification. The leader wore a blue jersey with colored vertical stripes ("maglia azzurra con banda tricolore verticale"). The Fiat Ritmo classification, which was created in honor Juan Manuel Santisteban who died in stage 1A of 1976 edition. The winner of the sprint in each stage received a Fiat 127 in this edition, as opposed to a Fiat 131 in its inaugural year.

Final standings

General classification

Points classification

Mountains classification

Young rider classification

Campionato delle Regioni classification

Traguardo Fiat 127 classification

Team points classification

References

Citations

 
Giro D'Italia
Giro d'Italia
Giro d'Italia by year
Giro d'Italia
Giro d'Italia
1977 Super Prestige Pernod